This is the list of the number-one songs of the UK Singles Downloads Chart during the 2020s. , 82 different singles have topped the chart during the 2020s, 13 of which have returned to number one they are "Blinding Lights" by The Weeknd, "Head & Heart" by Joel Corry, "Midnight Sky" by Miley Cyrus, "Wellerman" by Nathan Evans, "Let's Go Home Together" by Ella Henderson and Tom Grennan and "Anywhere Away from Here" by Rag'n'Bone Man, Pink, "Cold Heart" by Elton John and Dua Lipa, "Where Are You Now" by Lost Frequencies and Calum Scott, "As It Was" by Harry Styles, "Afraid to Feel" by LF System, "I'm Good (Blue)" by David Guetta and Bebe Rexha, "Made You Look" by Meghan Trainor and "Pointless by Lewis Capaldi.

Number one songs

By weeks at number one
Ten artists have spent seven or more weeks at the top of the UK Singles Downloads Chart so far during the 2020s. The totals below include only credited performances, and do not include appearances on charity ensembles.

By record label
Seven records labels have spent 10 weeks or more so far at number one during the 2020s.

External links
Official Singles Downloads Chart at the Official Charts Company

2020s in British music
United Kingdom Singles Downloads
Download 2020s